The Polynesian triller (Lalage maculosa) is a passerine bird belonging to the triller genus Lalage in the cuckoo-shrike family Campephagidae. It has numerous subspecies distributed across the islands of the south-west Pacific.

It is 15 to 16 cm long. The plumage varies geographically; some populations are contrastingly black and white while others have more grey or brown coloration.

It is a noisy bird with a nasal, rasping call. The song is short and high-pitched.

The breeding range extends through Fiji, Samoa, Tonga, Niue, Wallis and Futuna, Vanuatu and the Santa Cruz Islands. It occurs in a wide variety of habitats including man-made habitats such as plantations and gardens. It feeds on insects such as caterpillars and also feeds on fruit.

The cup-shaped nest is placed in the fork of a tree branch. One or two eggs are laid; these are greenish with brown blotches.

Gallery

Notes

References
Bregulla, Heinrich L. (1992) Birds of Vanuatu, Anthony Nelson, Oswestry, England.
Pratt, H. Douglas; Bruner, Philip L. & Berrett, Delwyn G. (1987), A Field Guide to the Birds of Hawaii and the Tropical Pacific, Princeton University Press, Chichester.

Polynesian triller
Birds of Vanuatu
Birds of Fiji
Birds of Tonga
Birds of Samoa
Birds of Polynesia
Polynesian triller
Taxa named by Titian Peale